The 1979 German Open was a men's tennis tournament played on outdoor clay courts at Am Rothenbaum in Hamburg, West Germany that was part of the Super Series of the 1979 Grand Prix circuit. It was the 71st edition of the event and took place from 14 May until 20 May 1979. Sixth-seeded José Higueras won the singles title.

Finals

Singles
 José Higueras defeated  Harold Solomon, 3–6, 6–1, 6–4, 6–1
 It was Higueras' 2nd singles title of the year and the 8th of his career.

Doubles
 Tomáš Šmíd /  Jan Kodeš defeated  Mark Edmondson /  John Marks, 6–3, 6–1, 7–6

See also
 1979 WTA German Open – women's tournament

References

External links
   
 ATP tournament profile
 ITF tournament edition details

German Open
Hamburg European Open
1979 in West German sport
German